The Qiyin lüe is a Chinese rime table, which dates to before 1161. This reference work survived to the present largely because the Song dynasty historian Zheng Qiao (/; Cheng Ch'iao; 1104–1162) included it in his 1161 encyclopedia Tongzhi.

The Chinese linguist Luo Changpei wrote a definitive study (1935) of the Qiyin lüe.
The structure and contents of the work is closely related to the Yunjing, and the two are believed to derive from a common source prior to the Song dynasty.
Both have tables combining rows for a particular final rime, columns for various initials, and up to four tones.

See also
 Rime dictionary

References

External links

parts 34–36 and 37–38 of the Tongzhi encyclopedia at the Internet Archive – the Qiyin lüe comprises parts 36 and 37
Rhyme Tables, Dylan W.H. Sung

Chinese dictionaries
Song dynasty literature
Middle Chinese
Traditional Chinese phonology